is a Japanese gravure idol.

Filmography

TV series
 Kudamaki hachibe (くだまき八兵衛) TV Tokyo February 3, 2011

References

External links
 Azusa Togashi's Official Blog - Since March 2007. 

1990 births
Living people
Models from Saitama Prefecture
Japanese gravure idols